Events from the year 1702 in Sweden

Incumbents
 Monarch – Charles XII

Events

 
 
 May – Warsaw is conquered by Charles XII of Sweden.
 July 19 (July 8 O.S.; July 9 Swedish calendar) – Battle of Klissow: Charles XII of Sweden decisively defeats the Polish–Lithuanian-Saxon army.
 9 July - Battle of Klissow
 19 July - Battle of Hummelshof

Births
 

 
 March - Lorens Pasch the Elder, painter   (died 1766)
 
 Unknown date - Bakelse-Jeanna, street seller and local profile   (died 1788)
 Unknown date - Margareta Momma, journalist and feminist   (died 1772)
 Unknown date - Christian Berner, ballet dancer (died 1773)

Deaths

 
 
 
 12 July - Bengt Gabrielsson Oxenstierna, politician  (died 1623)
 17 September - Olaus Rudbeck, scientist   (died 1630)

References

External links

 
Years of the 18th century in Sweden
Sweden